Ernst Dietrich Adolph Eichner [Ernesto Eichner] (born 15 February 1740 in Arolsen, died early 1777 in Potsdam) was a German bassoonist and composer.

Biography
Eichner was born to Johann Andreas Eichner (1694–1768), a court musician to the court of Waldeck. His father provided him with his primary musical education. He became widely known as a virtuoso bassoonist throughout Europe as a result. In 1762 he entered into the service of Duke Christian IV of Zweibrücken as a violinist. In 1768, he became the concertmaster of the Zweibrücken court orchestra, where he remained until 1772. He was highly respected by his contemporaries and achieved international recognition as an accomplished composer, bassoonist, and concertmaster during his lifetime. Eichner, however, died young and was quickly forgotten. To musicologists, he is known as a representative of the Mannheim School. His 31 symphonies and 20 concertos comprise the main body of his works, but he also composed chamber music including Six Flute Quartets op. 4. In 1772 his compositions were published almost simultaneously in Paris, London, and Amsterdam. Christian Friedrich Daniel Schubart praised Eichner's works in 1784 for their gracious charm and "melting sweetness". His Harp Concerto in D Major op. 9 (movements: Allegro, Andante, and Tempo di Minoetto) is performed to this day. His daughter was composer Adelheid Maria Eichner.

Awards
1772: Second prize in a symphony competition

Selected works
Orchestral
Six Symphonies op. 1 (1770)
Trois Symphonies à huit parties op. 5 (1772)
Trois Symphonies à huit parties obligées op. 6 (1772)
Six Symphonies à huit parties obligées op. 7 (1772)
Six Symphonies à huit parties op. 10 (1775)
Six Symphonies à grand orchestre op. 11 (1776)

Concertante
Concerto no. 1 for oboe and orchestra in B flat major (1764)
Concerto no. 2 for oboe and orchestra in D major (1770)
Concerto no. 1 for harp/piano and orchestra in C major (1771), also printed as Concerto for harpsichord and orchestra op. 6 (1777)
Concerto no. 2 for harp/piano and orchestra in D major op. 9 (1771)
Concerto no. 1 for bassoon and orchestra in C major (c.1771)
Concerto no. 3 for oboe and orchestra in C major (1772)
Concerto no. 2 for bassoon and orchestra in C major (1772)
Concerto no. 3 for bassoon and orchestra in C major (1778)
Concerto no. 4 for oboe and orchestra in B flat major (c.1779)
Concerto no. 4 for bassoon and orchestra in E flat major (1781)
Concerto no. 5 for bassoon and orchestra in B flat major (1782)
Concerto no. 6 for bassoon and orchestra in D major (1783)

Chamber music
Sechs Quartette (6 Quartets) for flute, violin, viola and cello op. 4
Sechs Duette (6 Duets) for violin and viola op. 10
Sechs Quartette (6 Quartets) for violin, viola, cello and double bass op. 12

Recordings
Sonata in C minor for harpsichord (from op. 9), performed by Rainer Kussmaul, on: RBM 463 193, CD (2001).
Six Flute Quartets op. 4, performed by Jan de Winne (flute), Ensemble Il Gardelino, on: Accent ACC 24183, CD (2006).
Oboe Concerto no. 3 in C major, performed by Kurt Meier (oboe), Northern Sinfonia, Howard Griffiths (cond.), on: Pan Classics PAN 510 088, CD (2007).
Harp Concertos op. 6 and 9; performed by Silke Aichhorn (harp), Kurpfälzisches Kammerorchester, Stefan Fraas (cond.), on: cpo 777 835-2, CD (2013).

External links
 
 Ernst Eichner in the catalog of the German Music Archive
 Literature about Ernst Eichner in the catalog of the German National Library
 Review (in German) of 2006 CD by Ensemble Il Gardellino on Klassik heute

1740 births
1777 deaths
18th-century classical composers
German Classical-period composers
Composers for harp
German classical bassoonists
German male classical composers
String quartet composers
18th-century German composers
18th-century German male musicians